Paweł Zagrodnik (born 10 September 1987, Ruda Śląska) is a Polish judoka.

He competed for his country at the 2012 Summer Olympics in judo and achieved fourth position, losing in controversial circumstances to Masashi Ebinuma in his bronze medal match.

References

External links
 

1987 births
Polish male judoka
Judoka at the 2012 Summer Olympics
Olympic judoka of Poland
Living people
Sportspeople from Ruda Śląska